The chief of the National Guard Bureau (CNGB) is the highest-ranking officer of the National Guard and the head of the National Guard Bureau. The position is a statutory office, held by a federally recognized commissioned officer who has served at least 10 years of federally recognized active duty in the National Guard; the Army National Guard or the Air National Guard. In a separate capacity as a member of the Joint Chiefs of Staff, the chief is a military adviser to the National Security Council, the Homeland Security Council, the secretary of defense, and the president on matters pertaining to the National Guard.

The chief is nominated for appointment by the president from any eligible National Guard officers holding the rank of major general or above, who also meets the requirements for the position as determined by defense secretary and the chairman of the Joint Chiefs of Staff, under the advice and/or recommendation from their respective state governors and their service secretary. The nominee must be confirmed via majority vote from the Senate. The chief serves a four-year term of office at the pleasure of the President. By statute, the Chief is appointed as a four-star general in the Army or Air Force, serving as a reserve officer on active duty.

History
In 1908, the United States Army created the Militia Bureau to oversee training and readiness for the National Guard as part of implementing the Militia Act of 1903.  From 1908 to 1911, Erasmus M. Weaver Jr. served as head of the Army's Militia Bureau, the first person to hold the position.  The National Defense Act of 1920 included a provision that the chief of the Militia Bureau must be a National Guard officer. In 1921 Pennsylvania National Guard officer George C. Rickards became the first Guardsman to serve as Chief, and he held the post until his 1925 retirement.

In September 1947, the Air National Guard was created, and the positions of Chief the Army Division and Chief of the Air Division were established, with the directors subordinate to the NGB Chief. In 1953, Air National Guard Director Earl T. Ricks served as acting chief of the National Guard Bureau, making him the first Air Guard officer to hold the chief's position.  In the mid-1970s, the chief of the National Guard Bureau position was elevated from major general to lieutenant general, and La Vern E. Weber became the first NGB chief to wear three stars.

The 2008 National Defense Authorization Act elevated the chief of the National Guard Bureau to the four-star rank of general making Craig McKinley the first National Guard officer to achieve four-star rank. In 2012, the position became the seventh member of the U.S. Joint Chiefs of Staff via the 2012 National Defense Authorization Act, which was signed into law by President Obama on 31 December 2011. The sitting Joint Chiefs at the time, had opposed the addition of another member, but the president promised in his 2008 campaign to elevate the office.

Previous flag

This positional flag for the chief of the National Guard Bureau was used from 1998 to 2008.  The dark blue represented the Army National Guard, the light blue represented the Air National Guard.  The badge in the center is the branch insignia of the National Guard Bureau.  The two triangles in the upper fly are "flight devices" and represent the Air National Guard.

The version of the flag which appears in the information box at the top of the page was adopted in 2008 when the position of Chief of the National Guard Bureau was upgraded to four-star general.

List of chiefs of the National Guard Bureau

See also
Senior Enlisted Advisor to the Chief of the National Guard Bureau

Notes

External links

Biography, Frank J. Grass

Joint Chiefs of Staff
National Guard Bureau